WQBR (99.9 FM) is a radio station broadcasting a Country/Americana music format. Licensed to Avis, Pennsylvania, United States, the station serves the Williamsport/Lock Haven/State College area, airing over substantial areas of Clinton, Lycoming and Centre Counties in Central Pennsylvania. Before the State College Arbitron ratings no longer were unavailable, the Bear was the only station that showed in both rating books. The area between Williamsport and State College is the defining line between the influence of Pittsburgh to the west, and Philadelphia to the east; no station had ever bridged those markets.

The station is owned by Maximum Impact Communications, Inc. and features news programming from AP Radio, some satellite music programming from the New Hit Country channel from Westwood One, and over 60 hours a week of local Americana music programming. In addition, the stations broadcast local Jersey Shore High School football and a complete schedule of sports from nearby Lock Haven University.

Located in McElhattan for 24 years, station ownership decided to move into their city of license, purchasing an old church building that had been abandoned in 2011, located at 103 West Highland Street in Avis. The newly renovated studios for WQBR-FM and their companion magazines, Good News and Pawsitively Pets, known as the Church of Country and Americana, opened for business in August, 2017. - mere months before the 25th anniversary of their sign-on - November 1, 1993.

The new studios include space for live performances and executive offices for employees, the social media center for the corporation (including the Bear Country Podcast Network) and our 501(c)(3) non-profit, the Bear Country Christmas Wish.

History

The station went on the air as WHUM on October 19, 1990. On January 6, 1993, the station changed its call sign to WDKK. On October 26, 1993, it changed to the current WQBR.

References

External links

QBR
Americana radio stations